Martin Joyce (24 January 1894 – 1960) was an English footballer who made 181 appearances in the Football League playing for Darlington and Durham City. He also played non-league football for Jarrow St Bede's.

Football career
Joyce was born in 1894 in Jarrow, County Durham, and began his football career with a local team, Jarrow St Bede's. He signed for Darlington ahead of their debut season in the newly formed Third Division North. He shared the left-back position with the veteran Tommy Barbour in 1921–22, and was later displaced by Jack O'Donnell before the latter's transfer to Everton, but otherwise he played regularly over six years with Darlington.

He played his part in the team that won the 1924–25 Third Division North title and gained promotion to the Second Division. A profile in the Derby Daily Telegraph at the start of the 1925–26 season described Joyce as "only of medium height and weight, but he takes his position well, and is very resourceful in recovering apparently lost positions", although his kicking "might be a little less erratic", and he had "come on by leaps and bounds" since joining the club. He went through that season as Darlington's only ever-present player as they retained their Second Division status, and again appeared regularly the following season as his team were relegated to the Northern Section. He finished his six-year career with Darlington with 166 Football League appearances.

He was listed for transfer, twice failed to obtain a reduction in the fee, and finished the season with Durham City in the Third Division North.

The 1939 Register finds him a widower with three children of working age, living in Etal Crescent, Jarrow, and working as a labourer in the shipyards. Joyce died in Jarrow in 1960 at the age of 65.

References

1894 births
1960 deaths
Sportspeople from Jarrow
Footballers from Tyne and Wear
English footballers
Association football fullbacks
Darlington F.C. players
Durham City A.F.C. players
English Football League players